Pachynoa thoosalis is a moth in the family Crambidae. It was described by Francis Walker in 1859. It is found in India, Papua New Guinea and Taiwan.

References

Moths described in 1859
Spilomelinae
Taxa named by Francis Walker (entomologist)